"Zoom" is a song by American band Fat Larry's Band released as the fourth single from their fifth studio album, Breakin' Out (1982).

The song was a commercial hit in the United Kingdom, peaking at number 2 on the UK Singles Chart. It also reached #10 on the Australian music charts, entering the chart on 13 December 1982 and spending 24 weeks on the chart. It was released in Australia on the Virgin label (Virgin VS-546). It remains one of the group's best-known songs, despite being received poorly in their native US, peaking at #89.

Legacy
Filipino singer Regine Velasquez covered the song for her 1996 Asian-released album Retro.

The song was featured in the 1982 Christmas Special episode of the British sitcom Only Fools and Horses, "Diamonds Are for Heather".

Charts

Weekly charts

Year-end charts

References

External links
 Zoom on Discogs

1982 singles
Songs written by Bobby Eli
Songs written by Len Barry
Virgin Records singles
1982 songs
Contemporary R&B ballads